Hunting Mister Heartbreak: A Discovery of America is a travelogue of Jonathan Raban's personal rediscovery of America following in the footsteps of European immigrants. It won the 1991 Thomas Cook Travel Book Award.


Introduction
Having arrived in Liverpool, I took a ship for the New World

For hundreds of years this sentence has tantalized and inspired Europeans. Jonathan Raban follows in the footsteps of Hector St John de Crevecouer - Mister Heartbreak and author of Letters from an American Farmer 1782)- and several million emigrants to discover America and the immigrant experience afresh. He sails from Liverpool docks to New York City and travels on to Alabama, Seattle, and the Florida Keys. Wherever he goes, there is a new identity to discover and a new life to live.

Plot summary 

In Hunting Mister Heartbreak, Raban sets off from the Port of Liverpool on board the 56,000 ton container ship Atlantic Conveyor, following in the footsteps of the first emigrants to America ("Having arrived in Liverpool, I took ship for the New World.") His meandering journey takes him to New York City, whose inhabitants he divides into the Street People - poor New Yorkers who have to face the daily threat of poverty and mugging - and the Air People - rich New Yorkers who rely on elevators to keep them off street level.

He leaves New York in distaste and proceeds in his hired car down to the Deep South, choosing to lie up for a time as a temporary resident of Guntersville, Alabama, a town which he immediately takes a liking to on one of his stopovers. He decides to devote some time to meeting the residents and absorbing the local lifestyle in his rented lakeside cabin in the company of Gypsy, an old black lab bitch on loan to scare off the anonymous caller who keeps on making threatening calls in the middle of the night. He then makes his way up to Seattle and rents a room in the Josephinum Residence. From here, he makes forays into the city and comes across some of the Korean immigrants who have struggled to carve out a new life for themselves in America. The books ends with Raban's search for the end of America in the Florida Keys, "the Land of Cockaigne". To fully explore and familiarise himself with the character of the Keys, he hires Sea Mist, a 32-foot sloop:

References 

Hunting Mister Heartbreak, Picador (1991) ,

External links
 Time, 'Keeping A Weather Eye' 
 The Guardian, September 23, 2006, 'Rootless in Seattle, Aida Edemariam 

1990 non-fiction books
American travel books